AltCar Expo is the alternative energy and transportation expo in Santa Monica Civic Auditorium.

Admission is free.

In the 2008 Expo (September 26 and 27), the Chevrolet Volt prototype was seen by more than 15,000 people in Santa Monica at AltCar Expo.

This expo went virtual since 2020.

Exhibitors 
 A123 Systems/Hymotion
 AC Propulsion
 Advanced Battery Systems
 American Custom Golf Cars
 American Honda Motor Company
 Ample
 Austin Energy
 Bad Boy Buggies
 Batteries Plus
 Better World Club
 Big Blue Bus
 California Department of Consumer Affairs
 California Green Designs
 California Energy Commission
 Canadian Electric Vehicles
 City of Santa Monica, Environmental Programs Division
 City of Santa Monica, Green Building Programs
 Coulomb Technologies
 Columbia Par Car
 Department of Consumer Affairs
 Earth Friendly Moving
 EcoLimo
 Elite Power Solutions, LLC 
 e-ride Industries
 EF9 Energy Systems
 Electrorides
 Electric Blue Motors
 Euro Taxi
 Free Drive-Ev Inc 
 General Motors
 Gimm Inc.
 Global Green
 Green Depot
 Green Earth Electric Vehicles
 Hi-Performance Golf Cars, Inc 
 International Environmental Solutions
 Invest Green
 Jungle Motors
 Los Angeles County Bike Coalition (LACBC) 
 Los Angeles Times
 Might-e-truck
 Miles Electric Vehicles
 National Biodiesel Board
 Petersen Automotive Museum
 Plug In America
 Plug in Partners
 Prometheus Systems
 REC Solar
 Rent A Green Box
 Revolution USA
 Roush Industries Inc.
 Santa Monica Ford
 Segway, Los Angeles
 Skeuter
 Society of Automotive Engineers
 Solar Santa Monica
 South Coast Air Quality Management District
 Southern California Edison
 Southern California Transit Advocates (abbreviated So. California Transit Advocates) 
 States Logistics Service Inc.
 Sustainable Transport Club
 Sustainable Works
 Studio MFT, INC
 T3 Motion, Inc., Inc.
 Taxi! Taxi!
 Tellurian BioDiesel, Inc.
 The Bikerowave
 The Electric Car Company of Long Beach
 The Transit Coalition
 Tom's Truck Center
 Toyota
 TrioBike
 Union of Concerned Scientists
 Vantage Vehicle International, Inc.
 Zero Motorcycles

See also 
 Alternative propulsion

References

External links 
 

Green vehicles
Auto shows in the United States
Tourist attractions in Santa Monica, California
Annual events in California